Empereur Island is a rocky island  north of Cape Margerie, lying immediately north of Breton Island in the entrance to Port Martin. It was photographed from the air by U.S. Navy Operation Highjump, 1946–47. It was charted by the French Antarctic Expedition under Andre-Frank Liotard, 1949–51, and so named because the first emperor penguin captured by the expedition was taken on this island.

Important Bird Area

A 283 ha site, including Empereur Island and Île des Manchots, Mont du Sphinx and Mont du Sabbat on the eastern coast of Cape Margerie, as well as Pointe de Cézembre and the intervening sea, has been designated an Important Bird Area (IBA) by BirdLife International because it supports about 35,000 breeding pairs of Adélie penguinss, estimated from 2011 satellite imagery.

See also 
 List of Antarctic and Subantarctic islands

References

External links 

Important Bird Areas of Antarctica
Penguin colonies
Islands of Adélie Land